McCuneville is an unincorporated community in Perry County, in the U.S. state of Ohio.

History
McCuneville had its start in 1829 when salt production began at the site. McCuneville was laid out in 1873, and named for the local McCune family. A post office called McCuneville was established in 1872, and remained in operation until 1951.

References

Unincorporated communities in Perry County, Ohio
Unincorporated communities in Ohio
1829 establishments in Ohio